Coming Home is the fourth studio album by American rock band Falling in Reverse. The album was released through Epitaph Records on April 7, 2017. It is the first album to feature guitarist Christian Thompson, the last album to feature drummer Ryan Seaman and guitarist Derek Jones, the latter of whom died in April 2020, and the only album to feature bassist Zakk Sandler.

Background 
The band members announced in 2016 that they had begun to work on their next album stating "It's a huge left turn. It sounds like nothing we've ever done. Every song is very vibey, there's more feeling in it instead of a lot of metal," further stating that, "We're challenging ourselves now more than we ever have in the weirdest ways possible, because you would think writing the craziest solo or riffs would be the challenging part. But the challenging part is trying to stick to a theme and not go all over the place like we would normally do." On December 19, the band released the first single "Coming Home" from the album that at the time was not named.  On January 20, 2017, the band announced that the album would be called "Coming Home." The same day, they released the single "Loser." The third single "Broken" was released on March 21, 2017. On April 4, 2017, they released a music video for "Coming Home."

Ronnie Radke played a previously unreleased song from the album titled "Carry On" during one of his Twitch streams, which drew high interest from fans in wanting the song for download or digital streaming. As a response to this, Falling in Reverse released the song on July 14, 2020.

Commercial performance
The album debuted at number 15 on the US Billboard Top Album Sales chart. As of May 2020, the album has already sold more than 97,000 copies in the United States.

Track listing

Personnel 
Credits for Coming Home adapted from AllMusic.

Falling in Reverse
 Ronnie Radke – lead vocals, keyboards, rhythm guitar (track 11), production
 Derek Jones – rhythm guitar, backing vocals
 Ryan Seaman – drums, percussion, backing vocals
 Zakk Sandler – bass guitar, backing vocals
 Christian Thompson – lead guitar, backing vocals

Additional personnel
 Nick Agee – assistant engineering
 Michael "Elvis" Baskette – production, mixing, guitars, bass guitar
 Carly Cressler – album layout
 Rowan Daly – back cover photography
 Brendan Donahue – band photography
 Mike Eckes – assistant engineering
 Patrick Kehrier – assistant engineering
 Jason Link – album layout
 Vlado Meller – mastering
 Jef Moll – engineering
 Tyler Smyth – production, engineering, programming, guitars, bass guitar
 Kevin Thomas – assistant engineering

Charts

References 

2017 albums
Epitaph Records albums
Falling in Reverse albums
Albums produced by Michael Baskette
Pop punk albums
Electropop albums
Space rock albums
Hard rock albums
Progressive rock albums
Post-hardcore albums